is a Japanese male badminton player from the Yonex team and educated at the Nippon Sport Science University. In 2014, he became the runner-up at the U.S. Open Grand Prix, tournament in men's doubles event partnered with Yoshinori Takeuchi. In 2016, he and Takeuchi also the semi finalist at the Malaysia International Challenge tournament.

Achievements

BWF Grand Prix 
The BWF Grand Prix has two level such as Grand Prix and Grand Prix Gold. It is a series of badminton tournaments, sanctioned by Badminton World Federation (BWF) since 2007.

Men's Doubles

 BWF Grand Prix Gold tournament
 BWF Grand Prix tournament

References

External links 
 

1992 births
Living people
Sportspeople from Hokkaido
Japanese male badminton players
21st-century Japanese people